Hildebrand may refer to:

People
People with Hildebrand as a given name:
Hildebrand, a character from Germanic legend
Hildebrand (bishop of Sées), flourished 849–84
Aldebrandus, (1119 – 1219), Bishop of Fossombrone and saint
Pope Gregory VII (né Hildebrand; c.1020 – 1085), Pope from 1073 to 1085
Hildebrand, a pen name for Nicolaas Beets (1814 – 1903)
Hildeprand, born c.700, King of the Lombards
Hildeprand of Spoleto, duke from 774 to 789
Hildebrand Elwell, English politician

People with the surname Hildebrand:
Hildebrand (surname)

Other
The Hildebrand Rarity, a James Bond short story by Ian Fleming
Hildebrand solubility parameter for predicting solubilities, especially of polymers
Old Hildebrand, a German fairy tale collected by the Brothers Grimm

See also
Hildebrandt (disambiguation)
Hildenbrand (disambiguation) 
Harvey Hilderbran, American politician